Jan Andre White (born October 6, 1948) is a former American football tight end who played two seasons with the Buffalo Bills of the National Football League. He was drafted by the Buffalo Bills in the second round of the 1971 NFL Draft. He played college football at Ohio State University and attended John Harris High School in Harrisburg, Pennsylvania.

References

External links
Just Sports Stats
College stats

Living people
1948 births
Players of American football from Harrisburg, Pennsylvania
American football tight ends
African-American players of American football
Ohio State Buckeyes football players
Buffalo Bills players
21st-century African-American people
20th-century African-American sportspeople